Colasposoma brevepilosum is a species of leaf beetle endemic to Socotra. The species was described by Stefano Zoia in 2012. The species name refers to the short pubescence of the dorsum.

Subspecies
There are three subspecies of Colasposoma brevepilosum:

 Colasposoma brevepilosum brevepilosum Zoia, 2012: The nominotypical subspecies.
 Colasposoma brevepilosum maritimum Zoia, 2012: The subspecies name refers to the specimens of the subspecies being collected at low altitude, not far from the sea.
 Colasposoma brevepilosum orientale Zoia, 2012: The subspecies name refers to the fact the specimen studied was collected in the easternmost area of Socotra.

References

brevepilosum
Beetles of Asia
Endemic fauna of Socotra
Insects of the Arabian Peninsula
Beetles described in 2012